Chatterbox also styled as CHATTERbOX was a project of the Crucified's Jeff Bellew. The project has hosted many session musicians, including Stavesacre and the Crucified's Mark Salomon, and Argyle Park and Circle of Dust's Scott Albert. Bellew has also played on Argyle Park's album Misguided, along with Salomon, Dirk Lemmenes (of Focused and Stavesacre), and multiple other musicians.

History
Chatterbox began following both the Crucified's disbanding and his touring stint with Mortal, in 1994 by Jeff Bellew. Bellew created the band, after being very inspired by Ministry, Mortal, and Circle of Dust. Jyro Xhan of Mortal helped produced Chatterbox's first demo, though Bellew would have preferred he had been more "hands-on".

Bellew would have Garret Morgan join the band guitars, and the two would write the debut album. The album, Despite, would be produced by Klayton Scott, and they would receive offers from labels such as Blonde Vinyl Collection and Tooth & Nail Records. Eventually, the band went with Tooth & Nail, with their debut album being the seventh release on the label. The album featured performances with Mark Salomon, and a few others. With the album completed, Bellew and Morgan took the band on tour with Focused and Unashamed, with Focused's bassist and Bellew's longtime friend Dirk Lemmenes joining on bass live and Chris Reid, who recorded on the album, on drums. While on tour, however, Bellew learned that his mother passed away from cancer. Once the tour was over, Chatterbox essentially embarked on hiatus. 

In 1999, the band released a second album, which was a compilation of demos, with the first three being from the Mortal demo, the next five being recorded with the full band, the next two being between Reid and Bellew, and the final song being Reid only. The album, titled The Nothing Inside You, was released through Rotting Audio Sound Recordings.

Members
Last known lineup
 Jeff Bellew – vocals, bass, guitar, samples (1994–1999)
 Garret Morgan – guitars, backing vocals (1994–1999)
 Chris Reid – guitar, bass, drums (1994–1999)

Live
 Dirk Lemmenes – bass (1994–1995)

Session musicians
 Mark Salomon – additional vocals, percussion
 Scott Albert – additional guitar, backing vocals
 Jack Bellew – narration
 Pidgeon John – percussion 
 John Stewart – backing vocals

Discography
Studio albums
 Despite (1994; Tooth & Nail)
 The Nothing Inside You (1999; Rotting Audio Sound Recordings)

References

External links

Tooth & Nail Records artists
Musical groups established in 1994
Musical groups disestablished in 1999
1994 establishments in the United States